To Dust is a 2018 American comedy-drama film directed by Shawn Snyder and starring Géza Röhrig and Matthew Broderick, Leo Heller and Sammy Voit.  It was produced by Emily Mortimer, Alessandro Nivola and Ron Perlman. The film premiered at the Tribeca Film Festival on 22 April 2018 followed by screenings at the San Francisco Jewish Film Festival and the Hamptons International Film Festival.

Plot
American Hasidic Jew, Shmuel, loses his beloved wife, Rivka, to cancer. Now he lives with his mother, two sons, and a terrible longing. While his mother advises Shmuel to "move on" and marry again, the children think that a dibbuk, the spirit of Rivka, has moved into their father. Longing and excitement drive Shmuel to look for answers to unexpected questions. What worries him most is the thought of what happens to his beloved wife’s body after burial and how quickly she turns to dust. To find answers and religious solace, Shmuel initially comes to a rabbi—but then forms an unlikely partnership with a professor of biology.

Cast
Géza Röhrig as Shmuel
Sammy Voit as Naftali
Matthew Broderick as Albert
Leo Heller as Noam
Janet Sarno as Faigy
Stephanie Kurtzuba as Receptionist
Ben Hammer as Rebbe
Larry Owens as Stanley
Bern Cohen as Reb Goshen
Aaron Raskin as Sender
Jill Marie Lawrence as Judy
Joseph Siprut as Undertaker
Zalman Raskin as Brother-in-Law
Sarah Jes Austell as Lab Receptionist
Natalie Carter as Security Guard
Marceline Hugot as Carol
Isabelle Phillips as Shprintze

Reception
The site's critical consensus reads: "Thematically ambitious and tonally audacious, To Dust tackles universally relatable topics in a bracingly original way." Metacritic, which uses a weighted average, assigned the film a score of 66 out of 100 based on 16 reviews, indicating "generally favorable reviews".

Richard Roeper of the Chicago Sun-Times commented "No doubt the material will offend some, given the nature of the storyline. And yet beneath the sometimes grisly visuals and the pitch-black humor and the general weirdness, this is the story of two men with precious little in common who become friends against all odds and help one another find a little peace in life." Classic buddy movie material. Robert Adele of the Los Angeles Times noted "The movie could use a little more energy — this is Paul Mazursky territory, after all, not Andrei Tarkovsky — but in its sick-but-sweet attempt to reclaim grief from the trappings of tradition, To Dust is its own well-measured godsend." Vulture's David Edelstein wrote that "To Dust is occasionally unintentionally cringe-inducing. The portrait of Shmuel will probably offend Orthodox Jews, despite — or perhaps because of — his continuous exclamations that everything he's doing is 'not Jewish.' The spirit of inquiry is extremely Jewish, but different communities have different levels of tolerance for going outside the lines."

Mark Dujsik of RogerEbert.com gave the film three stars out of four, and wrote: "Religion can provide some solace, but it can also complicate matters. Science can explain the natural processes, but even then, it cannot account for every detail in every situation. To Dust is about those contradictions and, in the end, about the ultimate one: that, to some questions, the only logical and spiritual answer is that there isn't one—except whatever we make of it."

Accolades 
The film won the Narrative Audience Award at the 2018 Tribeca Film Festival. The film was nominated for Best Screenplay at the 35th Independent Spirit Awards.

References

External links
 
 
 

2018 films
American comedy-drama films
Dybbuks in film
Films about Jews and Judaism
2010s English-language films
2010s American films